The men's 1500 metres at the 2011 Asian Athletics Championships was held at the Kobe Universiade Memorial Stadium on July 8.

Medalists

Records

Final

References

1500 metres
1500 metres at the Asian Athletics Championships